The 1920 Iowa State Cyclones football team represented Iowa State College of Agricultural and Mechanic Arts (later renamed Iowa State University) in the Missouri Valley Conference during the 1920 college football season. In their first and only season under head coach Norman C. Paine, the Cyclones compiled a 4–4 record (3–2 against conference opponents), finished in fourth place in the conference, and outscored opponents by a combined total of 98 to 48. They played their home games at State Field in Ames, Iowa. Marshall Boyd was the team captain.

Schedule

References

Iowa State
Iowa State Cyclones football seasons
Iowa State Cyclones football